= Heluva Good! 200 =

Heluva Good! 200 may refer to:

- The Heluva Good! 200 (Dover), a NASCAR Nationwide Series race held at Dover International Speedway between 2008 and 2010
- The Heluva Good! 200 (Loudon), a NASCAR Camping World Truck Series race held at New Hampshire Motor Speedway in 2009.
